Shorea lunduensis is a species of plant in the family Dipterocarpaceae. It is a tree endemic to Borneo.

See also
List of Shorea species

References

lunduensis
Endemic flora of Borneo
Trees of Borneo
Taxonomy articles created by Polbot